The 1976 United States Senate election in New York was held on November 2, 1976. Incumbent Republican U.S. Senator James L. Buckley ran for re-election to a second term, but was defeated by Democratic diplomat Pat Moynihan.

Democratic primary

Candidates
Bella Abzug, U.S. Representative from the West Side of Manhattan
Ramsey Clark, former United States Attorney General and nominee for Senate in 1974
Abraham Hirschfeld, real estate developer
Pat Moynihan, U.S. Ambassador to the United Nations and former Ambassador to India
Paul O'Dwyer, former New York City Council President and nominee for Senate in 1968

Convention

Primary results

Republican primary

Candidates
James L. Buckley, incumbent U.S. Senator since 1971
Peter A. Peyser, U.S. Representative from Irvington

Results

Results

See also 
 1976 United States Senate elections

References

Further reading
 Andelic, Patrick. “Daniel Patrick Moynihan, the 1976 New York Senate Race, and the Struggle to Define American Liberalism.” Historical Journal 57#4 (2014), Pp. 1111–33. online.

New York
1976
1976 New York (state) elections